Attila Doğudan (born 1959) is a Turkish and Austrian businessman, CEO of the Vienna-based Do & Co catering company.

Early life
Attila Doğudan was born to a Turkish father and Austrian mother in Istanbul, Turkey. He began his professional career with a charcuterie shop in Vienna, while he was studying economics.

Business performance
Doğudan earned Euro 1.2 million in 2014 and his 40% personal shares in Do & Co are worth Euro 300 million.

Awards
Doğudan has been awarded the "Manager of the Year 2015" award by the European Business Press (EBP).

The Turkish Airlines, catered by Do & Co received the Best Business Class Food and Beverage Award among European Airlines in 2015.

Personal life
Doğudan is married and has two sons: Attila Mark and Marius.

See also
 Turks in Austria

References

External links
 Do & Co website

1959 births
Austrian people of Turkish descent
Austrian businesspeople
Turkish businesspeople
Living people